Bala Jam Rural District is a rural district (dehestan) in Nasrabad District, Torbat-e Jam County, Razavi Khorasan Province, Iran. At the 2006 census, its population was 11,412, in 2,591 families.  The rural district has 20 villages.

References 

Rural Districts of Razavi Khorasan Province
Torbat-e Jam County